Governor Dix may refer to one of the following Governors of New York:
John Adams Dix (1798–1879)
John Alden Dix (1860–1928)